{{DISPLAYTITLE:Coenzyme Q10 deficiency}}

Coenzyme Q10 deficiency is a deficiency of coenzyme Q10.

It can be associated with COQ2, APTX, PDSS2, PDSS1, CABC1, and COQ9.
Some forms may be more treatable than other mitochondrial diseases.

References

External links 

 8th Conference of the International Coenzyme Q10 Association

Mitochondrial diseases
TCA and ETC metabolism disorders